My Uncle Zhou Enlai is a 2016 Chinese historical biographical television series directed by Chen Li and written by Zhang Fachun, starring Sun Weimin as the Chinese premier Zhou Enlai. The series also features Huang Wei, Tang Guoqiang, Ma Xiaowei, Lu Qi, Wang Wufu, Yang Buting and Zhao Liqiang. The script was loosely based on Zhou Enlai's niece Zhou Bingde's biography of the same name, and covers Zhou's life from the establishment of the Communist State to his death in 1976, focusing on his efforts to make the new China strong. The series was aired on CCTV-1 on July 4, 2016.

Synopsis
This drama describes the life of Zhou Enlai, who serves as Premier of the People's Republic of China, from the founding of the Communist State in 1949 to 1976 until his death.

Cast
 Sun Weimin as Zhou Enlai
 Hou Xianglin as young Zhou Enlai
 Huang Wei as Deng Yingchao

Communist Party
 Tang Guoqiang as Mao Zedong 
 Lu Qi as Deng Xiaoping
 Wang Wufu as Zhu De 
 Yang Buting as Liu Shaoqi
 Zhao Liqiang as Xi Zhongxun
 Li Shixi as Ye Jianying
 Wu Haiyan as Song Qingling
 Yao Bingyou as Shao Zili
 Zhang Yang as Tong Xiaopeng
 Shi Lin as Liao Mengxing
 Ding Jun as Luo Ruiqing
 Zhang Jianguo as Feng Jiping
 Cui Genshuan as Chen Yi
 Niu Ben as Shen Junru
 Ding Liuyuan as Sun Weishi
 Zhao Xiaochuan as Chen Yun
 Chen Rui as Nie Rongzhen
 Zhu Xinyun as Li Kenong
 Wang Guodong as Li Hu
 Wang Jian as Ren Bishi
 Shao Xiaowei as Chen Zongying
 Wang Bozhao as Zhou Enshou
 Hao Yan as Wang Shiqin
 Ding Yongdai as Geng Biao
 Guo Dongwen as Huang Zhen
 Zhang Xicai as Zhang Shizhao
 Lin Yujia as Sun Xinshi
 Lu Chang'en as Peng Dehuai
 Wan Siwei as Mao Anying
 Chu Xingyi as Luo Qingchang
 Lyu Yiding as Liao Chengzhi 
 Zheng Qiang as Huang Hua
 Zeng Yixuan as Zhou Bingde
 Zhou Xuqi as Li Xiannian
 Lyu Yi as Zeng Shan
 Ma Chongyue as Chen Guodong
 Kang Fulin as Zhou Bingjian
 Fu Fangjun as Zhou Binghe
 Quan Yicheng as Zhou Bingjun
 Wu Hao as Zhou Binghua
 Jiang Wenwen as Zhou Bingyi
 Song Xiaoying as Cai Chang
 Zheng Yu as Wu Jieping
 Yuan Xia as He Xiangning
 Cheng Guodong as Lin Boqu
 Wang Shuqin as Kang Keqing
 Xue Shujie as Zhuo Lin
 Liu Hanqin as Ji Pengfei
 Yang Tong as Zhuang Zedong

Kuomintang
 Ma Xiaowei as Chiang Kai-shek
 Su Li as Soong May-ling
 Lin Jinfeng as Chiang Ching-kuo
 Yue Xiaobing as Zhang Qun
 Guo Tiecheng as Mao Renfeng
 Ding Zijian as Zhou Zhirou
 Zhao Xiaoming as Duan Yunpeng
 Zhang Fan as Ye Xiangzhi

Foreigners
 Liu Ziqiang as Yamaguchi Ryuichi
 Wang Zhenli as Bung Sukarno
 Tian Jingshan as Ho Chi Minh
 Wang Guangzhi as Norodom Sihanouk

Production
My Uncle Zhou Enlai is base on the biography of the same name by Zhou Bingde, Zhou Enlai's nephew.

Chen Li was asked to direct the series. Before accepting this series, she has directed the film Zhou Enlai's Four Days and Nights.

In the autumn of 2010, Zhang Fachun signed on to write the script for the series. Zhang has said he had spent three years developing the series.

Sun Weimin is known for typecasting Zhou Enlai, he cast in lead role Zhou Enlai.

Most of the television series was shot on location in Rongguo House Film and Television Base, Zhengding County, north China's Hebei province.

Broadcast
My Uncle Zhou Enlai was broadcast on CCTV-1, CCTV-3 and Hebei Television in the summer of 2016.

The series received mainly positive reviews. On August 28, 2016, admiral Luo Yuan said in Wuhan, Hubei: "The series shows Premier Zhou Enlai's public servant spirit." Li Zhun, a Mao Dun Literary Prize laureate, said: "The series has made new explorations and new creation in the way of narration of historical themes. It integrates state and family affairs into one."

Accolades

References

External links
 
 

2016 Chinese television series debuts
2016 Chinese television series endings
Chinese period television series
Chinese documentary television series
Cultural depictions of Mao Zedong
Cultural depictions of Zhou Enlai
Cultural depictions of Zhu De
Cultural depictions of Liu Shaoqi
Cultural depictions of Deng Xiaoping
Cultural depictions of Peng Dehuai
Cultural depictions of Chiang Kai-shek